Andrew Ripp is an American singer and Grammy-nominated songwriter based in Nashville, Tennessee. Andrew first broke into the national music scene as a songwriter; his contributions, such as Ryan Cabrera's album, You Stand Watching, have charted on the Billboard Hot 100, Top 40 Mainstream, Pop 100 Airplay, Pop 100, and Hot Digital Songs charts. As an artist he has released five studio albums. Ripp's second album, She Remains the Same, was released on September 21, 2010, breaking the top 100 on the Billboard new artists chart. His third album, Won't Let Go, was produced by Grammy Award winner Charlie Peacock and was released on April 16, 2013 via Be Music & Entertainment.

In 2020, Ripp was nominated for a Grammy Award for co-writing the song "Rescue Story" by Zach Williams.

Music career
Ripp released his debut album, Fifty Miles to Chicago, in January 2008. Musicians Pete Maloney (Dishwalla, Tonic), keyboard player Will Hollis (The Eagles), and steel guitar player Eric Heywood (Ray LaMontagne) were brought in to accompany Ripp's vocals and guitar.

Ripp co-wrote and co-produced Fifty Miles to Chicago with songwriter, Randy Coleman and brought on Dan Lavery, former bass player of the rock band Tonic, as producer. Funded by Andrew himself, the majority of the album was recorded in Lavery's back-house studio in Los Angeles.

In early 2008, Andrew was invited to attend the annual "Fool's Banquet" songwriters gathering in Tulsa, Oklahoma. This event was hosted by the Hanson brothers. Also in attendance that year were Pat McGee, Keaton Simons, Jesse Laz-Hirsch, Kai Kennedy, Stephen Kellogg, Chris Sligh, and Jason Mraz.

Operating independently of a label, Ripp tours regularly and has shared the stage with Andy Grammer, Parachute, Ben Rector, Robert Randolph and the Family Band, Fiction Family (Jon Foreman of Switchfoot, Sean Watkins of Nickel Creek), Stephen Kellogg and the Sixers, and Sara Bareilles among others. In the spring of 2009, Ripp and his band toured Europe and the Middle East to play for the U.S. troops stationed abroad in a tour sponsored by Armed Forces Entertainment. In late 2011, Andrew opened up for the band Jars of Clay.

Andrew's highly acclaimed second album, She Remains the Same was released in September 2010. The album was produced by Dave Barnes, with whom Andrew toured in the late 2010.

On November 22, 2011, Ripp released the Christmas EP, Light of Mine.

He released his third album, Won't Let Go, on April 16, 2013 via Be Music & Entertainment. It was produced by GRAMMY Award winner, Charlie Peacock, and features the singles "Cool Ya (Nobody Loves You Like I Do) and "Falling for the Beat". "Falling for the Beat was featured on season 3, episode 2 of the TV Show House of Lies on SHOWTIME.

Andrew spent 2013 touring with Sara Bareilles, Plain White T's, Andy Grammer and Parachute.

On January 21, 2014, Andrew released a stripped down acoustic record entitled "Simple". "Simple" was produced by Paul Mabury and features acoustic versions of ten tracks from his record "Won't Let Go" as well as a cover of Justin Timberlake's "Mirrors". He hit the road in March 2014  with Judah & the Lion for his first ever headlining tour. The tour kicked off in Dallas and made stops in major cities including: Minneapolis, Chicago, Nashville, Atlanta, Charlotte, New York City, Boston, and Cincinnati, with many sold out shows along the way.

Discography

Albums

Extended plays

Singles

References 

American singer-songwriters
People from Palatine, Illinois
Living people
1982 births
21st-century American singers